Sud Sound System is a dancehall reggae sound system from Salento, Apulia, Italy. The group combines Jamaican rhythms and local culture, like their Salentino dialect of Sicilian language in their lyrics and dance moves from pizzica and tarantella.  They are pioneers of Italian ragga music,  a branch of reggae. Although the group is popular throughout Italy, they have become well known for their lyrics—always in dialect—about social, political, and economic issues in Southern Italy.

References

External links
 Official site 

Italian reggae musical groups
Musical groups from Apulia